The AGO C.IV was a First World War German biplane reconnaissance aircraft.

Development
A departure from the manufacturer's pod-and-boom designs, it featured a more conventional biplane layout whose only unusual feature was the tapered wings. Large orders were placed with AGO and two other manufacturers who were to build them under licence, but less than 100 were actually delivered. Although fast and well-armed, the C.IV was unstable in the air and was disliked by aircrew. Early production examples had a comma shaped rudder and no fin, while later aircraft had an additional curved fin, along with additional struts bracing the ailerons and tail.

Operators

Estonian Air Force.

Luftstreitkräfte

Specifications

References

Bibliography

 Gerdessen, Frederik. "Estonian Air Power 1918 – 1945". Air Enthusiast, No. 18, April – July 1982. pp. 61–76. .
 
 Airwar.ru

C.IV
AGO C.04
Military aircraft of World War I
Single-engined tractor aircraft
Biplanes
Aircraft first flown in 1916